Nepenthes gracilis (from Latin: gracilis "slender"), or the slender pitcher-plant, is a common lowland pitcher plant that is widespread in the Sunda region. It has been recorded from Borneo, Cambodia, Peninsular Malaysia, Singapore, Sulawesi, Sumatra, and Thailand. The species has a wide altitudinal distribution of 0 to 1100 m (and perhaps even 1700 m) above sea level, although most populations are found below 100 m and plants are rare above 1000 m. Despite being a widespread plant, natural hybrids between N. gracilis and other species are quite rare.

Nepenthes gracilis was formally described by Pieter Willem Korthals in his 1839 monograph, "Over het geslacht Nepenthes".

Nepenthes abgracilis from the Philippines is named for its superficial similarity to this species.

Carnivory
The small, elongated pitchers of N. gracilis appear relatively unremarkable and have a very thin peristome. Nevertheless, the species is unusual (and possibly unique) in that the underside of the pitcher lid bears an uneven layer of wax crystals. This layer is not as thick as, and structurally distinct from, that found in the waxy zone of the pitcher interior, and insects can easily adhere to it in dry conditions. During downpours, however, it functions as part of a trapping mechanism, whereby the impact of raindrops striking the lid causes insects to lose their footing and fall into the pitcher cup below.

Distribution

One of the most widespread Nepenthes species, N. gracilis is native to Borneo, Cambodia, Peninsular Malaysia, Singapore, Sumatra, central Sulawesi, and southernmost Thailand. It has also been recorded from many smaller islands, including Bangka, Batu Islands, Belitung, Bengkalis, Ko Lanta, Ko Tarutao, Labuan, Langkawi, Mendol, Mentawai Islands (Siberut), Meranti Islands (Padang, Rangsang, and Tebing Tinggi), Musala, Nias, Penang, Phuket, Riau Islands (Lingga Islands, Natuna Islands, and Riau Archipelago), and Rupat.

Taxonomy

In 2001, Charles Clarke performed a cladistic analysis of the Nepenthes species of Sumatra and Peninsular Malaysia using 70 morphological characteristics of each taxon. The following is a portion of the resultant cladogram, showing part of "Clade 6", which includes N. gracilis.

Infraspecific taxa

Despite varying little across its range, N. gracilis has a number of infraspecific taxa. Most of these are no longer considered valid.

Nepenthes gracilis f. angustifolia (Mast.) Hort.Westphal (1993)
Nepenthes gracilis var. angustifolia (Mast.) Hort.Weiner in sched. (1985)
Nepenthes gracilis var. arenaria Ridl. ex Macfarl. (1908)
Nepenthes gracilis var. elongata Blume (1852)
Nepenthes gracilis var. longinodis Beck (1895)
Nepenthes gracilis var. major Hort.Van Houtte ex Rafarin (1869)
Nepenthes gracilis var. teysmanniana (Miq.) Beck (1895)

Natural hybrids

The following natural hybrids involving N. gracilis have been recorded.

N. albomarginata × N. gracilis
N. ampullaria × N. gracilis [=N. × trichocarpa]
(N. ampullaria × N. gracilis) × N. bicalcarata [=N. × trichocarpa × N. bicalcarata]
N. bicalcarata × N. gracilis [=N. × cantleyi]
? N. eustachya × N. gracilis
N. gracilis × N. mirabilis [=N. × sharifah-hapsahii, N. × ghazallyana, N. × grabilis, N. neglecta?]
N. gracilis × N. northiana [=N. × bauensis]
N. gracilis × N. rafflesiana<ref>{{cite journal | author = Tan W.K., Wong C.L., Frazier C.K. | year = 1996 | title = Nepenthes × (rafflesiana and gracilis)? | journal = Nature Malaysiana | volume = 21 | pages = 82–85 }}</ref>N. gracilis × N. reinwardtianaN. gracilis × N. sumatranaReferences

Further reading

 Adam, J.H. 1997.  Pertanika Journal of Tropical Agricultural Science 20(2–3): 121–134.
 Adam, J.H. & C.C. Wilcock 1999.  Pertanika Journal of Tropical Agricultural Science 22(1): 1–7.
 
  Adam, J.H., J.N. Maisarah, A.T.S. Norhafizah, A.H. Hafiza, M.Y. Harun & O.A. Rahim et al. 2009. Ciri Tanih Pada Habitat Nepenthes (Nepenthaceae) di Padang Tujuh, Taman Negeri Endau-Rompin Pahang. [Soil Properties in Nepenthes (Nepenthaceae) Habitat at Padang Tujuh, Endau-Rompin State Park, Pahang.] In: J.H. Adam, G.M. Barzani & S. Zaini (eds.) Bio-Kejuruteraan and Kelestarian Ekosistem. [Bio-Engineering and Sustainable Ecosystem.] Kumpulan Penyelidikan Kesihatan Persekitaran, Pusat Penyelidikan Bukit Fraser and Universiti Kebangsaan, Malaysia. pp. 147–157.
  Akhriadi, P. 2007. Kajian taksonomi hibrid alami Nepenthes (Nepenthaceae) di Kerinci. Working paper, Andalas University, Padang. Abstract 
 
 
  Baloari, G., R. Linda & Mukarlina 2013. Keanekaragaman jenis dan pola distribusi Nepenthes spp di Gunung Semahung Kecamatan Sengah Temila Kabupaten Landak. Protobiont 2(1): 1–6. Abstract 
 
 Beaman, J.H. & C. Anderson 2004. The Plants of Mount Kinabalu: 5. Dicotyledon Families Magnoliaceae to Winteraceae. Natural History Publications (Borneo), Kota Kinabalu.
 
 Bourke, G. 2010.  Captive Exotics Newsletter 1(1): 4–7. 
 
 
 
  
 
 Chung, A.Y.C. 2006. Biodiversity and Conservation of The Meliau Range: A Rain Forest in Sabah's Ultramafic Belt. Natural History Publications (Borneo), Kota Kinabalu. .
  Deswita, E. 2010. Perkembangan ginesium beberapa jenis Nepenthes (N. ampullaria Jack., N. gracilis Korth. dan N. reinwardtiana Miq.). Thesis, Andalas University, Padang. Abstract 
 
  Enjelina, W. 2012. Analisis hibrid alam kantung semar (Nepenthes) di Bukit Taratak Kabupaten Pesisir Selatan Sumatera Barat dengan teknik RAPD. M.Sc. thesis, Andalas University, Padang. 
 
 Fashing, N.J. 2010.  In: M.W. Sabelis & J. Bruin (eds.) Trends in Acarology: Proceedings of the 12th International Congress. Springer Science, Dordrecht. pp. 81–84. 
 Frazier, C.K. 2000. Reproductive isolating mechanisms and fitness among tropical pitcher plants (Nepenthes) and their hybrids. [video] The 3rd Conference of the International Carnivorous Plant Society, San Francisco, USA.
  Handayani, T. 1999.  [Conservation of Nepenthes in Indonesian botanic gardens.] In: A. Mardiastuti, I. Sudirman, K.G. Wiryawan, L.I. Sudirman, M.P. Tampubolon, R. Megia & Y. Lestari (eds.) Prosiding II: Seminar Hasil-Hasil Penelitian Bidang Ilmu Hayat. Pusat Antar Universitas Ilmu Hayat IPB, Bogor. pp. 365–372.
  Harahap, A.S. 2010. Mikropropogasi tunas kantong semar (Nepenthes gracillis Korth.) dengan pemberian NAA dan BAP secara in vitro. Student paper, University of North Sumatra, Medan.
 Hernawati & P. Akhriadi 2006. A Field Guide to the Nepenthes of Sumatra. PILI-NGO Movement, Bogor.
 
 
 
 
 Kato, M., M. Hotta, R. Tamin & T. Itino 1993. Inter- and intra-specific variation in prey assemblages and inhabitant communities in Nepenthes pitchers in Sumatra. Tropical Zoology 6(1): 11–25. Abstract
 Kitching, R.L. 2000. Food Webs and Container Habitats: The natural history and ecology of phytotelmata. Cambridge University Press, Cambridge.
 
 Lam, S.Y. 1982. Tripteroides aranoides (Theobald) in two pitcher plants, Nepenthes ampullaria Jack and N. gracilis Korth., at Kent Ridge (Diptera: Culicidae). B.Sc (Hons.) thesis, National University of Singapore.
 Lee, C.C. 2000. Recent Nepenthes Discoveries. [video] The 3rd Conference of the International Carnivorous Plant Society, San Francisco, USA.
 Lim, A.L. & N. Prakash 1973. Life history of Nepenthes gracilis. Malaysian Journal of Science 2(A): 45–53.
 
 Ma Hnin Hnin Aung 2004. Phenolic compounds from Nepenthes gracilis Korth: isolation, identification and antioxidant studies. Ph.D. thesis, Nanyang Technological University, Singapore.
 
 
  Mansur, M. 2001.  In: Prosiding Seminar Hari Cinta Puspa dan Satwa Nasional. Lembaga Ilmu Pengetahuan Indonesia, Bogor. pp. 244–253.
  Mansur, M. 2007. Keanekaragaman jenis Nepenthes (kantong semar) dataran rendah di Kalimantan Tengah. [Diversity of lowland Nepenthes (kantong semar) in Central Kalimantan.] Berita Biologi 8(5): 335–341. Abstract
  Mansur, M. 2008. Penelitian ekologi Nepenthes di Laboratorium Alam Hutan Gambut Sabangau Kereng Bangkirai Kalimantan Tengah. [Ecological studies on Nepenthes at Peat Swamps Forest Natural Laboratory, Kereng Bangkirai Sabangau, Central Kalimantan.] Jurnal Teknologi Lingkungan 9(1): 67–73. Abstract 
 
 Moore, D. 1872. On the culture of Nepenthes at Glasnevin. The Gardeners' Chronicle and Agricultural Gazette 1872(11): 359–360. 
 
 
  Meimberg, H. 2002.  Ph.D. thesis, Ludwig Maximilian University of Munich, Munich.
 
 
 Merbach, M.A., G. Zizka, B. Fiala, U. Maschwitz & W.E. Booth 2001. Patterns of nectar secretion in five Nepenthes species from Brunei Darussalam, Northwest Borneo, and implications for ant-plant relationships. Flora 196: 153–160. 
  Meriko, L. 2010. Perkembangan androesium beberapa jenis Nepenthes (N. ampullaria Jack., N. gracilis Korth. dan N. reinwardtiana Miq.). M.Sc. thesis, Andalas University, Padang. Abstract 
 
 Miyagi, I. & T. Toma 2007. A new mosquito of the genus Topomyia (Diptera, Culicidae) from a Nepenthes pitcher plant in a Bario highland of Sarawak, Malaysia. Medical Entomology and Zoology 58(3): 167–174. Abstract
 
 Moran, J.A., W.E. Booth & J.K. Charles 1999.  Annals of Botany 83: 521–528.
 Mullins, J. & M. Jebb 2009. Phylogeny and biogeography of the genus Nepenthes. National Botanic Gardens, Glasnevin. 
  Murniati, Syamswisna & A. Nurdini 2013. Pembuatan flash card dari hasil inventarisasi Nepenthes di hutan adat desa Teluk Bakung. Jurnal Pendidikan dan Pembelajaran 2(1): [unpaginated; 14 pp.] Abstract 
 Normawati, Y. 2002. The effect of stem length on pitcher and inflorescence production in Nepenthes gracilis and Nepenthes mirabilis at Serendah Selangor. B.Sc. thesis. Universiti Kebangsaan Malaysia.
  Oikawa, T. 1992. Nepenthes gracilis Korth.. In: . [The Grief Vanishing.] Parco Co., Japan. pp. 38–39.
 
 
  Puspitaningtyas, D.M. & H. Wawangningrum 2007. Keanekaragaman Nepenthes di Suaka Alam Sulasih Talang - Sumatera Barat. [Nepenthes diversity in Sulasih Talang Nature Reserve - West Sumatra.] Biodiversitas 8(2): 152–156.  Cover 
  Rahim, S.A., T. Lihan, M. Baba, A. Laming, Z.A. Rahman, W.M.R. Idris, M.B. Gasim, A. Hashim, S.M. Yusof & L.H. Yin 2008. Pengambilan logam berat oleh Nepenthes gracilis dan N. Hookeriana dalam tanih bekas lombong besi dan timah, Pelepah Kanan, Kota Tinggi, Johor. [Heavy metal uptake by Nepenthes gracilis and N. Hookeriana in ex-iron and tin mine soil, Pelepah Kanan, Kota Tinggi, Johor.] Sains Malaysiana 37(1): 39–49. Abstract
 
 
 
 Shivas, R.G. 1984. Pitcher Plants of Peninsular Malaysia & Singapore. Maruzen Asia, Kuala Lumpur.
 Siegara, A. & Yogiara 2009. Bacterial community profiles in the fluid of four pitcher plant species (Nepenthes spp.) grown in a nursery. Microbiology Indonesia 3(3): 109–114.
 Slack, A. 1979. Nepenthes gracilis. In: Carnivorous Plants. Ebury Press, London. p. 86.
 Sun, W.F. 2008. In vitro induction of polyploidy in Nepenthes gracilis. M.Sc. thesis, University of Malaya, Kuala Lumpur.
  Syamsuardi & R. Tamin 1994. Kajian kekerabatan jenis-jenis Nepenthes di Sumatera Barat. Project report, Andalas University, Padang. Abstract 
  Syamsuardi 1995. Klasifikasi numerik kantong semar (Nepenthes) di Sumatera Barat. [Numerical classification of pitcher plants (Nepenthes) in West Sumatra.] Journal Matematika dan Pengetahuan Alam 4(1): 48–57. Abstract 
 
 
 Tan, S. 2006. Development of capillary electrophoresis techniques for plant natural products analyses. M.Sc. thesis, Nanyang Technological University, Singapore.
 Teo, L.L. 2001. Study of natural hybridisation in some tropical plants using amplified fragment length polymorphism analysis. M.Sc. thesis, Nanyang Technological University, Singapore.
  Teysmann, M.J.E. 1859. Énumération des plantes envoyées de Java au jardin botanique de l'Université de Leide. Annales d'horticulture et de botanique, ou Flore des jardins du royaume des Pays-Bas, et histoire des plantes cultivées les plus intéressantes des possessions néerlandaises aux Indes orientales, de l'Amérique et du Japon 2: 133–142.
 Thorogood, C. 2010. The Malaysian Nepenthes: Evolutionary and Taxonomic Perspectives. Nova Science Publishers, New York.
  Toufar, P. 1996. Ještě jednou k Nepenthes gracilis. Trifid 1996(2): 6–7. (page 2)
  Uji, T. 2003. Keanekaragaman dan potensi flora di Cagar Alam Muara Kendawangan, Kalimantan Barat. [Flora diversity and its potential in Muara Kendawangan Nature Reserve, West Kalimantan.] Biodiversitas'' 4(1): 112–117. 
 James Wong and the Malaysian Garden. [video] BBC Two.

Carnivorous plants of Asia
gracilis
Flora of Borneo
Flora of Malaya
Flora of Sulawesi
Flora of Sumatra
Flora of Thailand
Plants described in 1839
Least concern plants
Articles containing video clips